Cirò Marina is a comune and town with a population of 14,000 people in the province of Crotone, in Calabria, Italy.

History
Ciro Marina was conquered by the Spanish in the 16th century.

Economy
Ciro Marina relies on the production of oil, wine, cereals, citruses and intense breeding of cattle.

Ciro Marina's natural resources are the beaches and its historical sites which have yet to be exploited and adds benefits to the town's economy.

See also
Calabrian wine

References

Cities and towns in Calabria